Vanuatu competed at the 2018 Commonwealth Games in the Gold Coast, Australia from April 4 to April 15, 2018.

Beach volleyball athlete Miller Pata was the island's flag bearer during the opening ceremony.

The country won its first ever Commonwealth Games medal, a bronze won by para athlete Friana Kwevira in the women's javelin throw (F46) event.

Competitors
The following is the list of number of competitors participating at the Games per sport/discipline.

Medalists

| style="text-align:left; vertical-align:top;"|

Athletics

Vanuatu participated with 8 athletes (3 men and 5 women).

Men
Track & road events

Field events

Women
Track & road events

Field events

Beach volleyball

Vanuatu qualified a women's beach volleyball team for a total of two athletes.

Boxing

Vanuatu participated with a team of 3 athletes (3 men).

Men

Table tennis

Vanuatu participated with 5 athletes (2 men and 3 women).

Singles

Doubles

Team

See also
Vanuatu at the 2018 Summer Youth Olympics

References

Nations at the 2018 Commonwealth Games
Vanuatu at the Commonwealth Games
2018 in Vanuatuan sport